Kofi Nyamah (born 20 June 1975) is an English former professional footballer who played as a winger. He was born in Islington.

Career
After graduating from the Cambridge United youth team, Nyamah spent two seasons with the first team, scoring two goals in 23 appearances in the Football League between 1993 and 1995. Nyamah later played non-league football with Kettering Town, before returning to League football in 1996 with Stoke City, where he made 17 league appearances. After a gameless spell with Luton Town, Nyamah spent another spell in non-league football with Kingstonian, before he once again returned to League football with Exeter City, where he scored one goal in 35 league appearances. Nyamah then returned to play non-league football with Billericay Town, Stevenage Borough and Hayes.

Nyamah later made two league appearances for Boreham Wood.

Nyamah made 19 league appearances for Enfield Town during the 2007–08 season.

Career statistics
Source:

A.  The "Other" column constitutes appearances and goals in the Football League Trophy.

References

External links
 

1975 births
Living people
English footballers
Cambridge United F.C. players
Kettering Town F.C. players
Stoke City F.C. players
Luton Town F.C. players
Kingstonian F.C. players
Exeter City F.C. players
Stevenage F.C. players
Billericay Town F.C. players
Hayes F.C. players
Boreham Wood F.C. players
Enfield Town F.C. players
English Football League players
Association football wingers